RQA may refer to:

 Ruoqiang Loulan Airport, IATA code RQA
 Recurrence quantification analysis
 Research Quality Association